The big things of New Zealand are  large novelty statues located in small towns which typically relate to the town and its identity. Examples include the Taihape gumboot, in a town which has an annual gumboot-throwing contest; the large L&P bottle in Paeroa, the town where the drink originated, and the Big Sheep Shearer in Te Kuiti, where the national sheep-shearing competitions are held. A similar tradition is found in Australia.

List of big things

North Island

South Island

See also
 Australia's big things
 List of largest roadside attractions
 Novelty architecture

References

External links

"NZ's big statues and signs" – photographs of ten Big Things.
Map of New Zealand's big things, via Wikidata

Novelty architecture
Roadside attractions
Big Things
Big Things
Big Things
Sculpture series
Lists of works of art